Mathematical Proceedings of the Cambridge Philosophical Society is a mathematical journal published by Cambridge University Press for the Cambridge Philosophical Society. It aims to publish original research papers from a wide range of pure and applied mathematics. The journal, formerly titled Proceedings of the Cambridge Philosophical Society, has been published since 1843.

See also
Cambridge Philosophical Society

External links
official website

Academic journals associated with learned and professional societies
Cambridge University Press academic journals
Mathematics education in the United Kingdom
Mathematics journals